The Queens County Handicap is an American Ungraded Thoroughbred horse race run annually during the second week of December at Aqueduct Racetrack in Queens, New York. Open to horses age three years and older, it is contested on dirt at a distance of one and three-sixteenths miles (9.5 furlongs).

Inaugurated in 1902, the Queens County Handicap is one of America's oldest races still running. It was hosted by Belmont Park in 1946 and at the old Jamaica Racetrack in Jamaica, Queens, New York from 1956 to 1958. Since inception it has been contested at various distances:
 1 mile, 70 yards : 1902–1903
 1 mile : 1904–1939, 1959–1963
  miles : 1940–1958, 1993
  miles: 1964–1971, 2012 – present
  miles : 1972–1992, 1994–2011

The Queens County is, like many races at Aqueduct, named for a New York City borough.  Queens is the borough that includes the Aqueduct race track. It is also the largest of New York City's five boroughs.

There was no race run in 1909, and from 1911 through 1913. The race, once a graded stakes, has lost that status.

Historical notes

In winning the 1916 Queens County Handicap, Short Grass set a new United States record of 1:36 2/5 for one mile over a dirt course with a turn.

In 2001, three-year-old Evening Attire won the race. Six years later he came back to win it again at age nine, making him the oldest horse to ever win the Queens County Handicap.

Records
Speed record: (at distance of  miles)
 1:54.40 – Sunny And Mild (1972)

Most wins:
 2 – Roamer (1915, 1918)
 2 – Halcyon (1931, 1932)
 2 – Three Rings (1949, 1950)
 2 – Evening Attire (2001, 2007)

Most wins by a jockey:
 5 – Eddie Maple (1977, 1979, 1985, 1986, 1991)

Most wins by a trainer:

 5 – Sam Hildreth (1920, 1922, 1923, 1924, 1925)

Most wins by an owner:
 4 – Rancocas Stable (1922, 1923, 1924, 1925)

Winners

See also 
Queens County Handicap top three finishers and starters

Notes

References
 The 2009 Queens County Handicap at the NTRA

Horse races in New York City
Graded stakes races in the United States
Open middle distance horse races
Aqueduct Racetrack
Recurring sporting events established in 1902
1902 establishments in New York City